Grandmaster or Grand Master may refer to:

People 
 Grandmaster Flash, Joseph Saddler (born 1958), hip-hop musician and disc jockey
 Grandmaster Melle Mel, Melvin Glover (born 1961), hip-hop musician
 "Grandmaster Sexay", nickname for professional wrestler Brian Christopher

Arts, entertainment, and media

Fictional characters
 Grand Master (Jedi), also known as "Jedi Grand Master", or formally "Grand Master of the Jedi Order"—Order of the Jedi in Star Wars
 Grandmaster (DC Comics), a DC Comics character
 Grandmaster (Marvel Comics), a Marvel Comics character
 "Grandmaster B", a nickname used by Bud Bundy from the TV sitcom Married... with Children
Grand Master of Witches, a fictional character from the anime Tweeny Witches

Films
Grandmaster (1972 film), a Soviet drama film
 Grandmaster (2012 film), an Indian film
 The Grandmaster (film), a 2013 Hong Kong film

Music
 Grandmasters (album), an album by DJ Muggs and GZA

Positions
 Grand Master (ancient China)
 Grand Master (order), the head of various orders
 Grand Master of the Knights Hospitaller 
 Grand Master of the Knights Templar
 Grand Master of the Teutonic Order
 Grand Master (Masonic)
 Grand Master of Education, Science, and Culture, Francisco Macías Nguema (1924–1979), the first president of Equatorial Guinea

Superior skills

Grand master
 Grand Master, a rank in competitive shooting within the USPSA and IPSC
 Grand Master, the highest skill ranking in the Tetris: The Grand Master video game series
 Damon Knight Memorial Grand Master Award, awarded by the Science Fiction and Fantasy Writers of America
 Grand Master of Memory, awarded by the World Memory Sports Council

Grandmaster
 Grandmaster (chess)
 Grandmaster (martial arts)
 Grandmaster or Master craftsman, a member of a guild 
 Grandmaster, the highest skill ranking in the Overwatch video game
 MWA Grand Master Award, awarded by the Mystery Writers of America
 Spectrum Award for Grand Master awarded by Spectrum Fantastic Art
 World Grand Master (bridge), maintained by the World Bridge Federation
 World Horror Convention Grand Master Award, voted by participants in the annual World Horror Convention

Other uses
 Grand Master (custom car), winner of the 2002 Ridler Award 
 Grandmaster, the source for the time reference in Precision Time Protocol

See also
Grand Wizard